Harper's Hand-Book for Travellers (est.1862) was a series of travel guide books published by Harper & Brothers of New York. Each annual edition contained information for tourists in Europe and parts of the Middle East. The "indefatigable" William Pembroke Fetridge wrote most of the guides from 1862 until at least 1885.  In its day the Harper's Hand-Book competed with popular guides such as Baedeker, Bradshaw's, and Murray's. In 1867 critic William Dean Howells found Harper's Hand-Book "chatty and sociable." Readers included Lucy Baird, daughter of Spencer F. Baird.

References

Further reading
 
  + Index
 
 
 
 . 
 v.1 (Great Britain, Ireland, France, Belgium, and Holland)
 v.2 (Germany, Italy, Egypt, Syria, Turkey, and Greece) + Index
 v.3 (Switzerland, Tyrol, Denmark, Norway, Sweden, Russia, and Spain)
 . 
 v.2 (Germany, Italy, Egypt, Syria, Turkey, and Greece)
 v.3 (Switzerland, Tyrol, Denmark, Norway, Sweden, Russia, and Spain)
 . 
 v.2 (Germany, Italy, Egypt, Syria, Turkey, and Greece) + index
 .
 v.3 (Switzerland, Tyrol, Denmark, Norway, Sweden, Russia, and Spain)
 .
 v.2 (Germany, Austria, Italy, Egypt, Syria, Turkey, and Greece) + Index
 v.3
 . 
 v.1 (Great Britain, Ireland, France, Belgium, and Holland) + Index
 v.2 (Germany, Austria, Italy, Egypt, Syria, Turkey, and Greece)

External links
 HathiTrust.  1862-

Travel guide books
Series of books
Publications established in 1862
1862 establishments in New York (state)
Tourism in Europe